Leavy (Lee-Vee) is an Irish surname.

Notable people with the surname include:
 Bill Leavy, American football official
 Calvin Leavy (1940–2010), American blues musician
 Charles H. Leavy (1884–1952), American judge
 Edward Leavy (born 1929), American judge
 Jane Leavy, American sportswriter and feature writer
 Jim Leavy (1842–1882), Irish gunfighter in the Old West
 Joseph Britton Leavy (1872–1921), American philatelist at the Smithsonian Institution
 Stanley Leavy (1915–2016), American psychoanalyst

See also 
 McLeavy

Surnames of Scottish origin